Karsa River (Oromiffa qarsaa, "flat rock, whetting stone") is a river within western Ethiopia. A tributary of the Kobara, the river has been panned for gold in the past by the local inhabitants.

References 

Rivers of Ethiopia
Ethiopian Highlands
Geography of Oromia Region